Stefan Asenov (born 3 February 1972) is a Bulgarian former modern pentathlete. He competed at the 1992 Summer Olympics.

References

External links
 

1972 births
Living people
Bulgarian male modern pentathletes
Olympic modern pentathletes of Bulgaria
Modern pentathletes at the 1992 Summer Olympics
Sportspeople from Sofia